Amor en el desierto, is a Mexican telenovela produced by Televisa and originally transmitted by Telesistema Mexicano.

Cast 
 Guillermo Murray as Ahmed
 Jacqueline Andere
 Malena Doria
 Vicky Aguirre
 Fernando Mendoza
 Carlos Fernández
 Graciela Nájera
 Hortensia Santoveña
 Ismael Larumbe
 Jorge Vargas

References

External links 

Mexican telenovelas
Televisa telenovelas
Spanish-language telenovelas
1967 telenovelas
1967 Mexican television series debuts
1967 Mexican television series endings